The Ilkley Trophy, previously named as the Fuzion 100 Ilkley Trophy and the Aegon Ilkley Trophy, is a tennis tournament for male and female professional players played on grass courts. The event is classified as a €42,500 ATP Challenger and a $100,000 ITF Women's Circuit event. It has been held in Ilkley, United Kingdom, since 2015. The 2020 edition of the tournament was cancelled due to the COVID-19 pandemic and the 2021 edition was held in Nottingham instead because of the pandemic, but in 2022 both legs of the tournament are set to be held.

Past finals

Men's singles

Men's doubles

Women's singles

Women's doubles

See also
 Ilkley Open
List of tennis tournaments

References

External links
Official website

 
Tennis tournaments in England
Grass court tennis tournaments
ATP Challenger Tour
ITF Women's World Tennis Tour
2015 establishments in England
Recurring sporting events established in 2015
Ilkley